Edin Salkić (born 16 June 1989) is an Austrian football striker of Bosnian descent playing for Austrian club USV Kettlasbrunn.

Club career
Salkić spent his entire career in the Austrian leagues, playing for Wiener Neustadt at the country's top level.

References

External links
 Edin Salkić at Fussball Oesterreich
 

1989 births
Living people
Association football forwards
Bosnia and Herzegovina footballers
Austrian footballers
Austria youth international footballers
DSV Leoben players
SV Wienerberger players
SK Sturm Graz
SC Austria Lustenau players
TSV Hartberg players
SC Wiener Neustadt players
Floridsdorfer AC players
SKN St. Pölten players
Kremser SC players
FC Mauerwerk players
Austrian Regionalliga players
2. Liga (Austria) players
Austrian Football Bundesliga players
Austrian 2. Landesliga players
Austrian Landesliga players